Plaza Apartments may refer to:

 Plaza Apartments (Hot Springs, Arkansas), listed on the NRHP in Arkansas
 Plaza Apartments (Cleveland, Ohio), listed on the NRHP in Ohio
 Plaza Apartments (Philadelphia, Pennsylvania), listed on the NRHP in Pennsylvania